Sanluri  is a comune in Sardinia, Italy. It became part of the Province of South Sardinia, following the creation of that local unit in 2016.

In 1436, Sanluri was elevated to viscountship by the Aragonese Crown, and granted to Giovanni de Sena, baron of Quartu Sant'Elena and viscount of Sanluri, the feudalism lasted until the 1800s.

See also

 Battle of Sanluri, 1409.

References

Cities and towns in Sardinia